("kitchen brigade") is a system of hierarchy found in restaurants and hotels employing extensive staff, commonly referred to as "kitchen staff" in English-speaking countries.

The concept was developed by Georges Auguste Escoffier (1846–1935). This structured team system delegates responsibilities to different individuals who specialize in certain tasks in the kitchen or in the dining room.

List of positions
This is a comprehensive list of the members of a full kitchen brigade. Only the largest of establishments would have a staff of this size. As noted under some titles, certain positions are combined into other positions when such a large staff is unnecessary. Similarly,  means "kitchen", but also refers to food or cooking generally, or a type of food or cooking.
  (kitchen chef; "chief of the kitchen") is responsible for overall management of kitchen; supervises staff, creates menus and new recipes with the assistance of the restaurant manager, makes purchases of raw food items, trains apprentices, and maintains a sanitary and hygienic environment for the preparation of food.
  (sauce maker or sauté cook) prepares sauces and warm , completes meat dishes, and in smaller restaurants, may work on fish dishes and prepare sautéed items. This is one of the most respected positions in the kitchen brigade.
  (senior chef; "chief of the group") is responsible for managing a given station in the kitchen, specializing in preparing particular dishes there.
  (apprentice) are often students gaining theoretical and practical training in school and work experience in the kitchen. They perform preparatory work and/or cleaning work. An  is a male, and  female.
  (dishwasher or kitchen porter) cleans dishes and utensils, and may be entrusted with basic preparatory jobs.
  (roast cook) manages a team of cooks that roasts, broils, and deep fries dishes.
  (fish cook) prepares fish and seafood dishes.
Originally the entremets preparer.
(Cf. )
  (pantry supervisor; "food keeper") is responsible for preparation of cold , pâtés, terrines and aspics; prepares salads; organizes large buffet displays; and prepares charcuterie items.
  (spare hand/roundsman) moves throughout the kitchen, assisting other positions in kitchen.
  (butcher) butchers meats, poultry, and sometimes fish; may also be in charge of breading meat and fish items.
  (staff cook) prepares the meal for the restaurant staff.
  ("kitchen boy") in larger restaurants, performs preparatory and auxiliary work for support.
  (busser) clearing tables, taking dirty dishes to the dishwasher, setting tables, refilling

Summary table

See also

 Auguste Escoffier
 Chef
 List of restaurant terminology
 Waiting staff
 Maître d'hôtel, a front of house head

Notes

References

 Dominé, André (ed.). Culinaria France. Cologne: Könemann Verlagsgesellschaft mbh, 1998. 
 
 Patrick Rambourg, Histoire de la cuisine et de la gastronomie françaises, Paris, Ed. Perrin (coll. tempus n° 359), 2010, 381 pages. 

Restaurant terminology
Culinary terminology